The 2018 ACB Playoffs, also known as 2018 Liga Endesa Playoffs for sponsorship reasons, was the postseason tournament of the ACB's 2017–18 season, which began September 29, 2017. The playoffs started on 27 May 2018 and ended on 19 June 2018 with the Finals.

Valencia Basket was the defending champion, but was defeated in quarterfinals by Herbalife Gran Canaria, who achieved qualification to the EuroLeague for the first time ever, but was defeated in semifinals by Real Madrid who won their 34th title after defeating Kirolbet Baskonia in finals.

Format
At the end of the regular season, the eight teams with the most wins qualify for the playoffs. The seedings are based on each team's record.

The bracket is fixed; there is no reseeding. The quarterfinals are best-of-three series; the team that wins two games advances to the next round. This round is in a 1–1–1 format. From the semifinals onward, the rounds are best-of-five series; the team that wins three games advances to the next round. These rounds, including the Finals, are in a 2–2–1 format. Home court advantage in any round belong to the higher-seeded team.

Playoff qualifying
On 8 April 2018, Real Madrid became the first team to clinch a playoff spot.

Bracket
Teams in bold advance to the next round. The numbers to the left of each team indicate the team's seeding, and the numbers to the right indicate the result of games including result in bold of the team that won in that game.

Quarterfinals
All times are in Central European Summer Time (UTC+02:00)

Real Madrid v Iberostar Tenerife

This was the first meeting in the playoffs between Real Madrid and Iberostar Tenerife.

Kirolbet Baskonia v Unicaja

This was the ninth playoff meeting between these two teams, with Kirolbet Baskonia winning five of the first eight meetings.

FC Barcelona Lassa v MoraBanc Andorra

This was the second playoff meeting between these two teams, with FC Barcelona Lassa winning the previous meeting.

Valencia Basket v Herbalife Gran Canaria

This was the first meeting in the playoffs between Valencia Basket and Herbalife Gran Canaria.

Semifinals
All times are in Central European Summer Time (UTC+02:00)

Real Madrid v Herbalife Gran Canaria

This was the 3rd playoff meeting between these two teams, with Real Madrid winning the previous two meetings.

Kirolbet Baskonia v FC Barcelona Lassa

This was the 13th playoff meeting between these two teams, with FC Barcelona Lassa winning seven of the first 12 meetings.

Finals
All times are in Central European Summer Time (UTC+02:00)

This was the 11th playoff meeting between these two teams, with Real Madrid winning seven of the first 10 meetings.

References

External links
Playoffs official website
Playoffs news

2018
playoffs